Li Hui was a Chinese contemporary artist.

Biography
Beijing based artist Li Hui (1977–2020) graduated from the China Central Academy of Fine Arts in 2003.
. As a conceptual artist, he worked in diverse mediums including transparent neon-lit acrylic sculptures and laser beams, and visualized the uniqueness and new boundaries of the new age of Chinese New Media art in his sculptures.

With the help of most modern techniques, Li Hui articulated considerations and an almost poetic aura surround the result.

Li Hui and his work have been featured in various art exhibitions, e.g. Museum Moderner Kunst Stiftung Ludwig Wien (AUT), the National Art Museum of China in Beijing (CN) and the National Museum of Contemporary Art Seoul, (South Korea).

Besides that, Li Hui exhibited at Busan Biennale (South Korea) (2006), Shanghai Biennale (CN) (2006), Chengdu Biennale (CN) (2005)

Death 
Li Hui has died at the age of 43 on 4 May 2020 of an undisclosed illness.

Publications
 Young Chinese Artists; Christoph Noe et al.; Prestel; 2008

References

External links
 Li Hui at The Ministry of Art 
 Li Hui featured at 

Living people
Artists from Beijing
Central Academy of Fine Arts alumni
Laser art
1977 births